Eight Bells may refer to:

 Eights bells, a duty period on board ship, see ship's bell
 Eight Bells (album), a 2009 album by SubArachnoid Space
 Eight Bells (band), an American experimental metal band based in Portland, Oregon
 Eight Bells (film), a 1935 action adventure film directed by Roy William Neill
 Eight Bells (painting), an 1886 oil painting by Winslow Homer
 Eight Bells, Fulham, a pub in Fulham High Street, London, England
 The Eight Bells, Hatfield, a grade II listed public house in Park Street, Hatfield, Hertfordshire, England